Tulemalu Lake is a lake in Kivalliq Region, Nunavut, Canada.

See also
List of lakes of Nunavut
List of lakes of Canada

References

Lakes of Kivalliq Region